The 1971 Calgary Stampeders season was the 14th season for the team in the Canadian Football League and their 27th overall. The team finished in first place in the Western Conference with a 9–6–1 record and won the franchise's second Grey Cup title with a 14–11 victory over the Toronto Argonauts in the 59th Grey Cup game.

Preseason

Regular season

Season standings

Season schedule

Playoffs

West Final

 Calgary won best-of-three series 2–0, advancing to the Grey Cup Championship game.

Grey Cup

Awards and records
CFL's Most Outstanding Lineman Award – Wayne Harris (LB)

1971 CFL All-Stars
OG – Granville Liggins, CFL All-Star
DT – John Helton, CFL All-Star
DE – Craig Koinzan, CFL All-Star
LB – Wayne Harris, CFL All-Star
DB – Frank Andruski, CFL All-Star

References

Calgary Stampeders seasons
Grey Cup championship seasons
N. J. Taylor Trophy championship seasons
1971 Canadian Football League season by team